Mark "Thurop" Ashton Van Orman (born April 26, 1976) is an American cartoonist, animator, voice actor, television writer, producer and director best known for being the creator of Cartoon Network's The Marvelous Misadventures of Flapjack, in which he voices the title character.

Life and career 
Van Orman was born and raised in Norfolk, Virginia.

Van Orman worked for the video game company Zantaro before going on to study character animation at the California Institute of the Arts. He was the storyboard artist and co-writer for Camp Lazlo, The Powerpuff Girls, and The Grim Adventures of Billy & Mandy. He was also the supervising producer for Adventure Time and served as one for Sanjay and Craig only in its first season. Thurop is also somewhat known for responding to much of his fans' fan art through the website DeviantArt. He is the director of The Angry Birds Movie 2. 

Van Orman has a brother named Jonny, from whom he took inspiration to start his animation career at Cartoon Network for Flapjack. He has been married to Sherri Van Orman since 1999 and has three children: a son named Leif, a daughter named Blossom, and a younger daughter named Hazel.

Upcoming films 
He is currently working on his stop motion film project titled Black Forest, as well as provided concept art for the film adaptation of The Little Prince. He has also announced via Twitter that he will be writing a film about Vikings.

Inspirations 
His work took inspiration from Gary Larson, Jim Henson, Stephen Hillenburg, Craig McCracken, E. H. Shepard, Richard Scarry, Maurice Sendak, Mercer Mayer, Ronald Searle, Robert Crumb, Sergio Aragonés, Fleischer Studios, and his brother Jonny.

Filmography

Film

Television

Voice roles

References

External links
 
 Thurop Van Orman on DeviantArt

1976 births
Living people
American animators
California Institute of the Arts alumni
Cartoon Network Studios people
Nickelodeon Animation Studio people
American male voice actors
Showrunners
American people of Dutch descent
American television writers
American male television writers
American television directors
American animated film directors
American animated film producers
American male screenwriters
American storyboard artists
Sony Pictures Animation people